Tikal (feminine: Tikalová) is a Czech surname. Notable people with the surname include:

 František Tikal (1933–2008), Czechoslovak ice hockey player
 Ladislav Tikal (1905–1980), Czechoslovak gymnast
 Oldřich Tikal (born 1938), Czech rower
 Václav Tikal (1906–1965), Czechoslovak painter and ceramic artist
 Zdeněk Tikal (1929–1991), Australian ice hockey player

See also
 

Czech-language surnames